The Kitáb al-Íqán or Kitáb-i-Íqán ("Book of Certitude") is one of many books held sacred by followers of the Baháʼí Faith; it is their primary theological work. One Baháʼí scholar states that it can be regarded as the "most influential Quran commentary in Persian outside the Muslim world," because of its international audience. It is sometimes referred to as the Book of Íqán or simply The Íqán.

Background 
The work was composed partly in Persian and partly in Arabic by Baháʼu'lláh, the founder of the Baháʼí Faith, in 1861, when he was living as an exile in Baghdad, then a province of the Ottoman Empire. While Baháʼu'lláh had claimed to have received a revelation some ten years earlier in the Síyáh-Chál (lit. black-pit), a dungeon in Tehran, he had not yet openly declared his mission. References to his own station therefore appear only in veiled form. Christopher Buck, author of a major study of the Íqán, has referred to this theme of the book as its "messianic secret," paralleling the same theme in the Gospel of Mark. The Íqán constitutes the major theological work of Baháʼu'lláh, and hence of the Baháʼí Faith. It is sometimes referred to as the completion of the Persian Bayán. Shoghi Effendi referred to the work as follows:

A model of Persian prose, of a style at once original, chaste and vigorous, and remarkably lucid, both cogent in argument and matchless in its irresistible eloquence, this Book, setting forth in outline the Grand Redemptive Scheme of God, occupies a position unequalled by any work in the entire range of Baháʼí literature, except the Kitáb-i-Aqdas, Baháʼu'lláh's Most Holy Book.

History 
The uncle of the Báb, Ḥájí Mírzá Siyyid Muḥammad, had been perplexed to hear that the promised one of Islam was his own nephew. When he was told that this was the same objection voiced by the uncle of the prophet of Islam, he was shaken and decided to investigate the matter. In 1861 he traveled to Karbala, Iraq, to visit his brother, Ḥájí Mírzá Ḥasan-ʻAlí, and then went to Baghdad to meet Baháʼu'lláh. There he posed four questions about the signs of the appearance of the promised one in writing to Baháʼu'lláh. The 200 pages (in original languages) of the Kitáb-i-Íqán were written in the course of at most two days and two nights in reply about January 15, 1861.

The Kitáb-i-Íqán was probably the first work of Bahá’u’lláh that was published in print. A lithographed edition was published by relatives of the Báb (the Afnáns) in Bombay, India, around 1299 AH (1882 CE) by the Ḥasaní Zívar Press. It was first translated into English in 1904, one of the first works of Baháʼu'lláh to appear in English. Shoghi Effendi re-translated the work into English in 1931.

Contents 
The book is in two parts: the first part deals with the foundational discourse that divine revelation is progressive and religions are related to one another, with each major monotheistic religion accepting the previous ones and, often in veiled terms, prophesying the advent of the next one. Since the questioner is a Muslim, Baháʼu'lláh uses verses from the Bible to show how a Christian could interpret his own sacred texts in allegorical terms to come to believe in the next dispensation. By extension the same method of interpretation can be used for a Muslim to see the validity of the claims of the Báb. The second and larger part of the book is the substantive discourse and deals with specific proofs, both theological and logical, of the mission of the Báb. One of the best-known and best-loved passages of this part is known as the "Tablet of the True Seeker."

Shoghi Effendi has offered the following lengthy description of the book's content:Within a compass of two hundred pages it proclaims unequivocally the existence and oneness of a personal God, unknowable, inaccessible, the source of all Revelation, eternal, omniscient, omnipresent and almighty; asserts the relativity of religious truth and the continuity of Divine Revelation; affirms the unity of the Prophets, the universality of their Message, the identity of their fundamental teachings, the sanctity of their scriptures, and the twofold character of their stations; denounces the blindness and perversity of the divines and doctors of every age; cites and elucidates the allegorical passages of the New Testament, the abstruse verses of the Quran, and the cryptic Muhammadan traditions which have bred those age-long misunderstandings, doubts and animosities that have sundered and kept apart the followers of the world's leading religious systems; enumerates the essential prerequisites for the attainment by every true seeker of the object of his quest; demonstrates the validity, the sublimity and significance of the Báb's Revelation; acclaims the heroism and detachment of His disciples; foreshadows, and prophesies the world-wide triumph of the Revelation promised to the people of the Bayán; upholds the purity and innocence of the Virgin Mary; glorifies the Imams of the Faith of Muhammad; celebrates the martyrdom, and lauds the spiritual sovereignty, of the Imam Husayn; unfolds the meaning of such symbolic terms as "Return," "Resurrection," "Seal of the Prophets" and "Day of Judgment"; adumbrates and distinguishes between the three stages of Divine Revelation; and expatiates, in glowing terms, upon the glories and wonders of the "City of God," renewed, at fixed intervals, by the dispensation of Providence, for the guidance, the benefit and salvation of all mankind. Well may it be claimed that of all the books revealed by the Author of the Baháʼí Revelation, this Book alone, by sweeping away the age-long barriers that have so insurmountably separated the great religions of the world, has laid down a broad and unassailable foundation for the complete and permanent reconciliation of their followers.

See also
 Kitáb-i-Aqdas (The Most Holy Book)
 Kitáb-i-Badíʻ
 Gems of Divine Mysteries
 Some Answered Questions (Book)
 Baha'i Literature

Notes

References

Further reading

 Ishraq-Khavari, 'Abdu'l-Hamid (1972). Qamus-i Iqan. 4 volumes (in Persian; used in the annotations section of Hooper Dunbar's book).
 Mírzá Abu'l-Faḍl (1898). Fara'id (The Peerless Gems; in Persian).

 

 
 Related documents on bahai-library.com
•Kourosh, Sohrab (2016 & 2021). Self Study Notes for The Kitáb-i-Íqán, Book of Certitude, Kourosh Publishing, USA. Volume I: ISBN 978-0-692-81182-5, and Volume II: ISBN 9798656226516.

External links
 Outline of the Kitáb-i-Íqán
 Compendium on the Kitáb-i-Íqán
 A Pocketful of Meaning, compilation of terms, phrases and symbols used in Sacred Writings

1861 books
1861 in religion
Works by Baháʼu'lláh